Wilson's Hospital School is a Church of Ireland, co-educational boarding school located in a protected Georgian building in Multyfarnham, County Westmeath, Ireland, outside of Mullingar. Founded in 1761, it is "Westmeath's oldest school".

History
Wilson's Hospital School was founded in 1761 by Andrew Wilson as a school for young Protestant boys and also as a hospital for old men. The school's main Georgian building, including its 220-seater chapel, was designed by architect John Pentland and completed between 1759 and 1761. It is listed, together with other structures on the grounds, on the Record of Protected Structures for County Westmeath. 

The school grounds were the site of a battle preceding the Battle of Ballinamuck during the 1798 rebellion in which 150–300 rebels were killed.

Over time the school ceased functioning as a hospital but still retained this title within its name. Operating as an all-boys school for 200 years, it became co-educational in 1969 when it was amalgamated with the Preston School from Navan. This connection is reflected in the name of a newer classroom block, The Preston Building.

In September 2022, the High Court ordered the jailing of a suspended teacher for refusing to comply with a court order preventing him from attending the school. This followed his rejection of disciplinary procedures after reputedly interrupting school business to object to its guidelines on addressing transgender students. Sanctioning his release in December 2022, the High Court judge noted that the teacher "wrongly claimed he face[d] jail because of his religious convictions" and was "exploiting his imprisonment for his own ends". Following a disciplinary hearing in January 2023, the teacher was dismissed from his role at the school.

Teaching
The school caters for approximately 400 students. While many of the school's students are boarders, a number of day pupils also attend the school. As the diocesan secondary school of the Diocese of Meath and Kildare, Wilson's Hospital School operates under a Church of Ireland ethos.

The school operates a five-day boarding week and teaching schedule. Before the COVID-19 pandemic, there was a seven-day boarding week which allowed boarders the option of returning home at weekends or remaining at the school to avail of the weekend activity programmes. The day pupils of Wilson's Hospital School are drawn from surrounding areas. Academically, the school offers a range of subjects up to higher Leaving Certificate standard.

Sport
Wilson's Hospital fields schoolboy rugby teams in "Section A" of the Leinster Branch's schools competitions. Former sportspeople, associated with the school, include Andrew Thompson and Joe Schmidt (who coached at the school in the 1990s).

The school also fields hockey teams, and has a "partnership" with Mullingar Hockey Club.

Notable people
Andrew Thompson, rugby player and former student
Enoch Burke, former teacher

References

External links

Secondary schools in County Westmeath
Private schools in the Republic of Ireland
Anglican schools in the Republic of Ireland
Educational institutions established in 1761
Hospitals established in the 1760s
1761 establishments in Ireland